Sahadeva (Sanskrit: सहदेव) was the youngest of the Pandava brothers, the five principal protagonists of the epic Mahabharata. He and his twin brother, Nakula, were blessed to King Pandu and Queen Madri by invoking the twin gods Ashvins. Trained by Drona, Kripa and Brihaspati, Sahadeva is described to be skilled in swordsmanship and astrology, and also Neeti Sastra. He went on a war campaign to southern part of India to subjugate kingdoms for the Rajasuya sacrifice, after crowning his Pandava brother Yudhishthira as the emperor of Indraprastha. He was exiled for 13 years along with his Pandava brothers, when Yudhishthira lost all his possessions, his brothers, and their common wife Draupadi to Duryodhana of Kuru Kingdom of Hastinapur during a dice game played by the vily Shakuni, the maternal uncle of Duryodhana. During his one year incognito living, as part of 13 years exile, he disguised as a cowherd and served in the Kingdom of Virata.  During the 18-days Kurukshetra War, he slew many warriors including Shakuni. After the war, Yudhishthira appointed Sahadeva as the king of southern Madra. During his final journey of pilgrimage to the Himalayas, he succumbed en route, after Draupadi.

Etymology 
The word sahadeva is derived from two Sanskrit words saha (सह) and deva (देव). Saha means with and deva is a Hindu term used for deity. So literally, Sahadeva means with Gods. Another meaning is thousand Gods. Sahadeva and his brother Nakula, are both called as Ashvineya (आश्विनेय), as they were born from Ashvins. In southern India, he was regarded as a very accomplished astrologer, a face reader and all other forms of intuitive perception, but because of his secretive nature in revealing anything though full knowing the situation he is called "Sahadeva" colloquially.

Birth and early years
Due to Pandu's inability to bear children (because of the curse of rishi Kindama), Madri had to use the boon given to Kunti by sage Durvasa to give birth, who invoked the Ashwini Kumaras to beget Nakula and Sahadeva. Though they were twins, they had altogether different charchterstics, physically and mentally. Nakula was born at sunrise while Sahadeva was born at sunset. Sahadeva was an occultist and Nakula was an Ayurvedic physician but both very valiant in warfare in archery and deft use of swords. When Nakula and Sahadeva were born, a divine voice had proclaimed: "[t]hese virtuos and accomplished sons will transcend in energy and beauty even their celestial fathers."

Later, Pandu died due to his Kindama's curse when he attempted to make love with his wife. Madri handed over her children to Kunti and committed sati. Kunti raised him along with his brothers in Hastinapur with love and care. It is believed that Sahadeva was Kunti's favourite Pandava, in spite of not being her biological son.

The Pandava brothers along with their mother Kunti were escorted from their forest dwelling by Bhishma to Hastinapur to live with their uncle King Dhritarashtra who ruled over the Kuru Kingdom.

There is also a story that Pandu, father of Pandavas, when he was about to die had a premonition of his death revealed to his sons that his years of abstinence and meditation in the forest had blessed him with immense knowledge which is imbibed in his body. He instructed his sons saying: "[w]hen I die, eat my flesh and you will be blessed with all great knowledge. That shall be your true inheritance." But Pandu was cremated and hence Pandavas could not follow his instructions. Suddenly at the crematorium, Sahadeva saw ants crawling out with piece of his father's body and he forthwith grabbed the ants and swallowed them. From then on Sahadeva imbibed knowledge of "everything of the past and even of future events". Eagerly, he went to his mother (Kunti) and his brothers to convey the knowledge he had acquired from his father. But he met a stranger, who was none other than Krishna, who advised him not to tom-tom or boast about the knowledge he had acquired. Sahadeva thus "knowing everything but is never able to tell anyone". Following this incident, Sahadeva acquired knowledge of various mystical sciences that helped him to predict future events. Even today, a secretive man who never reveals anything despite having full knowledge of a situation is colloquially referred as 'Sahadeva'.

In Hastinapur, Sahadeva and Nakula were instructed in the gurukula for 16 years by guru Dronacharya and Kripa in warfare and use of weapons such as bow and arrows and martial art. He also mastered his skills in fencing and axe fighting. At the end, Sahadeva alone also acquired the knowledge of Neeti Sastra (Essence of Statesmanship), astronomy and astrology, economics, and civil administration from Brihaspati, guru of the Devas during a two years travel through southern India.

Marriage and children
Later, Kunti and the five Pandavas moved to Hastinapura. Sahadeva's core skill was the wielding of the sword. Sahadeva is said to be mild-mannered, bashful, patient, and virtuous in every aspect, except he was arrogant about his wisdom and his spiritual knowledge.

Sahadeva had two wives: Draupadi, the common wife of the Pandavas, and Vijaya, whom he married. Sahadeva's son with Draupadi was Shrutasena and in the Kuruskhetra war he killed Dushasana's son and avenged the death of Abhimanyu, Arjuna's son. His son with his other wife Vijaya was Suhotra. Vijaya chose Sahadeva in her svayamvara, and hence their marriage was arranged. Vijaya was Sahadeva's maternal cousin. It is also said Sahadeva had two other wives – Bhanumathi and Jarasandha's daughter and their children's name is not known.

Conquest and Rajasuya Yagna

Sahadeva was sent south by the eldest Pandava, Yudhishthira, to subjugate kingdoms for the Rajasuya sacrifice, after being crowned as the emperor of Indraprastha. He was specifically chosen for the southern campaign because of his expertise with the sword, and because Bhishma opined that Southerners are skilled with sword-fighting in general. A verse in the scriptures also mention that Sahadeva before his invasion south of Indraprastha, had forced tribute from Antioch, Rome and the City of the Greeks. His twin brother Nakula is said to have conquered the Huns along with Chinese to give tribute at the Rajasuya Yagna. The brothers including Sahadeva went for out in four directions for sbjugating other kingdoms and rulers and collected huge bounties which enriched the treasury of Indraprastha Kingdom immensely. The Mahabharata mentions several kingdoms to the south of Indraprastha which were conquered by Sahadeva. Some of them are as under:
Surasenas
Pandyan Dynasty
Matsya, the king Dantavakra, kings Sukumara, Sumitra, other Matsyas and Patacharas.
Kings of Lanka who claimed to be descendants of Vibhishana, the king of Lanka and brother of Ravana. He offered him diverse kinds of jewels and gems, sandalwood, celestial ornaments, costly apparel and valuable pearls.
At Kishkindha, the monkey-kings Mainda and Dwivida were defeated in a 7-day war.
City of Mahishmati, which was ruled by King Nila. Since the kingdom had the blessings of Agni, a huge fire obstructed the army when Sahadeva tried to invade; later prayer to Agni enabled Sahadeva to complete the conquest.
 King Rukmi of Vidarbha and territories of Bhojakata
Nishadas, the hill of Gosringa and King Sreenimath.
 Navarashtra, under King Kunti-Bhoja
 King Jamvaka, on the banks of the river Charmanwati.
 Territories lying on the banks of the Venwa.
 Kingdoms that lay on the banks of the Narmada.
 Avanti, kings called Vinda and Anuvinda, a town of Bhojakata
 King of Kosala
 King of Tripura
 King of Saurashtra
 Surparaka kingdom, Talakatas and Dandakas
 Mlechchha tribe living on the sea coast, Nishadas, the cannibals, Karnapravarnas, and the Kalamukhas (a cross between human beings and Rakshasas) and the whole area of the Cole mountains.
 Surabhipatna and the island called the Copper island, and a mountain called Ramaka.
 The town of Timingila and a wild tribe is known by the name of the Kerakas who were men with one leg.
 The town of Sanjayanti, countries of the Pashandas, Karahatakas, Paundrayas, Dravidas, Udrakeralas, Andhras, Talavanas, Kalingas and Ushtrakarnikas, Sekas and Yavanas
 Paurava kingdom

The venue and other aspects related to the conduct of the Rajasuya Yagna was elaborately done under the stewardship of Bhishma. He ordained that the person who deserves the honour of the first sacred arghya of the Yagnya would be Krishna who commands the qualities of a Brahma and Kshatra, of a rishi, a yogi and a king. He immediately signalled to Sahadeva to begin the proceedings by washing the feet of Krishna as the first recipient to receive sacred arghya, in form of the water of the Sarasvati. Sahadeva was too happy to preform this task. He went to Krishna, placed his feet lovingly in a flat vessel and poured the holy water of the Saraswati river mixed with five sacred herbs on Krishna's feet, he then touched his feet to his forehead and proceeded to dry them with a towel. After drying he proceed to apply sandal paste to them and to venerate him with a form of worship offered to the first among equals in a yagna.

Exile

Following Yudhishthira's loss in the game of dice meant that all Pandavas including Draupadi had to live in exile for 13 years with last year in Agnatavas (incognito). p. 214

As the Pandavas departed Hastinapur, the entire populace of the city had lined along the streets in grief. Sahadeva had then smeared his face with mud thinking "none should recognise me in this hour of calamity". Nakula covered himself with ashes. Arjuna scattered sands to symbolize the countless arrows he would let loose in battle, Bhima walked with his hands outstretched to indicate to people that no one could equal him, and Yudhishthira had covered his face. Kunti had appealed to Draupadi to take care of her son Sahadeva as he holds a special place in her heart; Draupadi had left Hastinapur along with the Pandavas wearing a single safron cloth with her hair disheveled. p. 214

During their exile, travelling on pilgrimage from place to place, Sahadeva and his brothers were living at Vadarika (also known to be Badarikasrama). A rakshasa named Jatasura was also living amidst them in disguise of a learned Brahmin, and enjoying their hospitality. Suddenly, when Bhima was away from the camp on a hunting trip, Jatasura assumed the form of a demonic rakshasa and forcibly abducted Yudhishthira, Nakula, Sahadeva, and Draupadi, with the objective of seizing their weapons. Sahadeva some how extricated himself from the clutches of Jatasura and attacked him with his sword, and at the same time calling out to Bhima for help. Jatasura also counter attacked Sahadeva. A long fight ensued between them, and Sahadeva initially felled Jatasura to the ground. Sahadeva had then thrown his axe at him but Jatasura rose up and gave a hard slap to Sahadeva and threw him to the ground; Yudhisthira, Nakula and Draupadi were distressed and told Jatasura that his death was near. Sahadeva and Jatasura continued the fight by uprooting trees and throwing them at each other, and at one stage, Sahadeva by throwing his axe had cut off the Jata or hair tuft by which the rakshasa was known as Jatasura, which infuriated him further. The rakshasa then, with magical powers, as a mayavi, had asssumed immense proportions and relentlessley attacked and injured Sahadeva. But then Bhima appeared on the scene eventually, and challenged Jatasura, asking his brothers to keep away. In a very fierce fight, Bhima hit Jatasura's head with his mace and slayed him. Sahadeva and his brother Nakula with their brothers Bhima and Yudhishthira then trekked to a nearby lake, which was surrounded by a herbal forest, where they nursed their wounds.

In the 13th year, Pandavas collectively decided that the Virata Kingdom of king Virata would be an ideal place for them to hide in disguise. The day after Draupadi's entrance into Virata's palace as Sairandhri, 'an expert maid', in the name of Malini, employed by Queen Shudeshna, Sahadeva made his way into the city dressed as a cowherd. He arrived at one cow posture in the region of Virata's palace. The king happened to be visiting his herd and was present when he saw a handsome well built man clad in a cowherd's dress, and speaking the dialects of the cowherds. Beholding him the king was struck with amazement. He asked Sahadeva, "To whom dost though belong" and whence though come; What work dost though seek: I have never seen thee before." Sahadeva replied saying that he was a Vaisya, Arishtinemi by name, and was earlier in the employment of Kuru King Yudhishthira, the eldest of the five sons of Pandu and had tended to eight hundred thousand cattle and that people used to call him 'Tatripala' (Pandavas however called him Jayadbala), and that he knew the present, the past and the future of all kine (cows) living within ten yojanas. He also told the king the means by which kine population could be multiplied in a short time, and that he liked the work of taming, milking and breeding cattle. Impressed with the resume narrated by Sahadeva, King Virata employed him in his palace as the chief cowherd who supervised the maintenance and upkeep of all cows in his kingdom, while his elder brothers assumed different roles in disguise to work in Virata's court. Yudhishthira assumed the identity of game entertainer to the king and called himself Kanka, Bhima was the cook Ballava, Arjuna taught dance and music as eunuch Brihannala and dressed as a woman, and Nakula tended horses as Granthika. In Virata's kingdom, the Pandavas in disguise had a very hilarious but entertaining time but also a mini war erupted when Duryodhana was trying to locate them so that he could send them back to exile again, which ultimately revealed their identity at the end of the Agnyatavasa period of one year. p. 606.

With the all powerful brother-in-law of King Virata, Kichaka's death at the hands of Bhima due to his lascivious behaviour towards Sairanadri (Draupadi), Virata was weakened. Then scenting that Pandavas were hiding in the Virata's court, Susharma, King of Trigatas and the Kauravas invaded Matsya Kingdom successively, not only captured Virata but also robbed him of his immense cattle wealth. Virata, with the help of the four Pandavas in his employment, Yudhisthira, Bhima, Nakula and Sahadeva defeated Susharma and freed King Virata. Meanwhile, the Kurus in cohets with Susharma, robbed Virata's kingdom of sixty thousand cattle. However, they were defeated by Arjuna, with Prince Uttara, son of Virata as a charioteer. The Kurus, including Karna, were humiliated and returned the cattle to Virata and went back to Hastinapur. It was also the last day of the one year agnyatavasa of the Pandavas, and when they revealed their true identity to King Virata and Kauravas.

Role in the Kurukshetra War 

With the Pandavas finishing their Agnyatavasa in Virata's Kingdom and King Virata welcoming them heartily as his allies, and assuring them all help to get back their territory from the Kauravas, the issue of division of the Kuru Kingdom became a matter of deep debate concern. Krishna, Yudhishthira and his mother Kunti wanted the issue of sharing the Kingdom of Hastinapur with Kauravas be negotiated by Krishna and as a last resort propose to Duryodhna and his father Dhritarashtra to at least give them five provinces - Kushasthal, Vrikosthal, Asanti, Varnavat and any other of their choice if they do not agree to part with Indrapratha kingdom which the Pandavas had established and had lost it to Duryodhana in an unfair dice game. None of the Pandavas were hopeful of a solution and each had an axe to grind against the Kauravas and felt that war was inevitable. But Sahadeva told Krishna in a cynical way, with ‘tongue in cheek’  to first break Shakuni's dice and kill Shakuni or cut-off Draupadi's hair as she would have nothing to tie up and her vow would be futile or even tie up Krishna up so that he will not be up to his tricks. Krishna's mission for mediation failed and there was even an attempt by Duryodhana to imprison him.

Then Duryodhana declared that war was the only course left and meets his father to fix an auspicious date and muhurtha to start the war at Kurukshetra. He first asks his uncle Shakuni to tell him the right time to start the war but he is unable to do it. Then Shakuni suggests the name of Sahadeva as the best astrologer in the country to be consulted. Before the war, Duryodhana went to the camp of Pandavas near the battle ground, on the advice of Shakuni, approached Sahadeva seeking the right time (muhurta) to start the Mahabharata war so that the Kauravas would be victorious. Duryodhana offered to spare the life of Sahadeva and his twin after the war, and make them kings in exchange and promised them Indraprastha as their kingdom. Sahadeva declined his offer but disclosed the date for the war in spite of knowing that Kauravas were their enemy, as Sahadeva was known to be very honest in his profession. Then, Krishna planned to create an eclipse much before the beginning of the war. In the meantime, both Sun and Moon got shocked by Krishna's thoughts and appeared before Krishna stating that this will create a huge imbalance in the entire Universe temporarily; as the appearance of the Moon would happen as an illusion a day earlier. Then, Krishna declared that as Earth, Moon and Sun are together in one place, this in itself was an eclipse. Even before the great war, Duryodhana would always ask Sahadeva about his future and Sahadeva would tell his future. He was the most favourite Pandava of Duryodhana. When King Dhritarashtra asked his devoted advisor Sanjay, who had the gift of seeing events at a distance (divya-drishti) right in front of him, about the credentials of Sahadeva, Sanjaya described Sahadeva as the “non-demanding, non-egoistic, non-covetous bhakth".

As the Pandavas assembled an army of seven akshouhinis for the war, seven generals were considered to select a Chief of this army - Drupad, Virata, Dhristadyumna, Shikandi, Satyakim Chekitana, Ghatotkacha and Bhima. Then Sahadeva, the wise diplomat, was asked for his opinion. He suggested the name of King Virata of Matsya Kingdom for this honour as he considered him a valiant king skilled in weaponry who could stand up to Bhishma and other Maharathis in the Kaurava army. Sayascachi suggested the name of Dhristadyumna who was a very colourful warrior, mighty-armed, and radiant who could challenge Bhishma. But Yudhishthira and Arjuna opted for Dhristadyumna.

Just before the Kurukshetra war started, another tragic event that took place on the bank of a river was of Karna donating his Kavach (breast plate armour) and Kundala (ear-rings) that were glued to his chest since birth, as a protection of immortality, and made him an invincible warrior; an old Brahmin appeared before Karna on the river bank and had asked Karna to give his Kavach and Kundala as a gift; the old Brahmin was none other than demi-god Indra, in disguise. This act was done intentionally to weaken the strength of Karna in the ensuing war against Arjuna. But as a compensation, Indra gave him a weapon, a missile, called 'Vassavi Shakthi' that could only be used once and would kill any mortal or immortal.

Because of forcible peeling of the kavacha from Karna's chest, his chest started bleeding and he collapsed into an unconscious state. Kunti, who was watching this numbing incident, rushed to help Karna, and Karna's foster parents, Adhiratha and Radha, also reached there. Radha insisted that Kunti should call her sons who were proficient in Ayurvedic herbal treatment to cure Karna. Kunti then sent messengers to fetch Nakula and Sahadeva to come and help. They came and saw Karna in a distressful state but were hesitant to help Karna as he was in their enemy camp and had resolved to kill their brother Arjuna. They even wondered why Kunti should be helping him at all as if he was her own son. On Kunti's pleadings, Sahadeva relented and prepared an herbal paste and applied to the wound and also gave an oral decoction to drink which Kunti forced on her unconscious son. With this treatment Karna soon regained consciousness and was taken to his house in Hastinapur. Karna's mother Radha prostrated to Sahadeva and thanked him for helping Karna. Then, Dhriatrashtra coming to know of this incident through the vision of his advisor Sanjay, called Sahadeva to his palace and thanked him, and also enquired him about his Divya drishti.

As a warrior, Sahadeva slew prominent warriors of the enemy side. The flag of Sahadeva's chariot bore the image of a silver swan. His conch was called Manipushpaka which he blew at the beginning of the war. The bow which he used in the war was known as Ashwina. He defeated 40 brothers of Duryodhana while fighting them simultaneously. On the 13th day, his advance into the Chakravyuha was stopped and repelled by Jayadratha. On the night of the 14th day, Sahadeva was defeated by Karna but his life was spared as Karna had made a promise to Kunti that he would only kill Arjuna.

During the gambling loss, Sahadeva took an oath of slaying Shakuni. He accomplished this task successfully on the 18th day of battle. While the war was in full swing, and Sahadeva was fighting Kripa, he saw Shakuni attacking the Pandava army. His fury revived, he first killed Shakuni's son Uluka and he called out to Shakuni and challenged him to a fight. Shakuni in grief on the loss of his son, and in great fury attacked Sahadeva with three arrows and also threw a scimitar at him. Sahadeva responded relentlesly and was even hurt. Then when faced with ferocios occult powers, Shakuni created illusory magical tricks played by Shakuni, when Sahadeva was in loosing stage, he had no alternatiave but to call for Krishna who was steering fight of Arjuna in another front. Krishna then remotely foiled Shakuni's magical strikes.

At this stage of the war, Draupadi in her ferocious look with loose tresses and clad in blood-red cloth made an illusory presence before Shakuni in his chariot which chilled him to the bone. Shakuni found to his utter dismay that his dice had turned to ashes. He was numbed with terror. Thus, Draupadi had marked him for death.

Then Shakuni was pursued relentlessly and slayed by Sahadeva, recalling to him of his dastardly act of the dice game engineered by him which resulted in humiliation of Draupadi in the court, by an attempt to disrobe her. He severed Shakuni's head with a broad headed arrow made of hard iron which was capable of penetrating every armour. There was great rejoicing in the Pandava camp as Shakuni was the chief villain of the Mahabharata war.

With Shakuni's death at the hands of Sahadeva, Duryodhana runs away in fear from the battle field and hides in a lake. Then Sahadeva calls to Duryodhana to come out of the lake and take the armour (kavacha) sent by his mother through him with her blessings. He tells him to wear it before his fight with Bhima.

Later life and death 

After the war, Yudhishthira appointed Nakula as king of Northern and Sahadeva as the Kings of southern Madra. Suhotra, son of Sahadeva from his wife Vijaya, would eventually be crowned as the heir to the Madra Kingdom.

Upon the onset of the Kali Yuga and the departure of Krishna, the Pandavas retired. Giving up all their belongings and ties, the Pandavas, accompanied by a dog, made their final journey of pilgrimage to the Himalayas seeking heaven. Except for Yudhishthira, all of the Pandavas grew weak and died before reaching heaven. Sahadeva was the second one to fall after Draupadi. When Bhima asked Yudhishthira why Sahadeva fell, Yudhishthira replied that Sahadeva took much pride in his wisdom.

Associated temples

Thrikodithanam Mahavishnu Temple is one of the five ancient shrines in the Kottayam-Alappuzha-Pathanamthitta area of Kerala, connected with the legend of Mahabharata, where the five Pandavas are believed to have built one temple each. This temple has in it the Vishnu image consecrated by Sahadeva. It is one of the 108 Divya Desam temples dedicated to Krishna, an avatar of Vishnu, who is worshipped as Mahavishnu.

In the media
In Mahabharat (1988 TV series), Sanjeev Chitre acted as Sahadeva
 In 2013 version of the Mahabharata, Sahadeva was portrayed by Lavanya Bhardwaj
In the TV show Suryaputra Karn, Suchit Vikram Singh acted as Sahadeva
In Radhakrishn (2018-) tv show, Sahadeva was portrayed by Vikas Singh

References

Characters in the Mahabharata